is a Japanese yuri light novel series written by Hitoma Iruma and illustrated by Non, which began serialization in October 2012 in ASCII Media Works' Dengeki Bunko Magazine and is published under the Dengeki Bunko imprint. The light novels are licensed for English release in North America by Seven Seas Entertainment. The series has been adapted into two manga series, and an anime television series adaptation by Tezuka Productions aired from October to December 2020.

Plot
First-year high school students Sakura Adachi and Hougetsu Shimamura encounter each other by chance one day while skipping class, and become friends. Over time, Adachi develops romantic feelings for Shimamura, which she has significant difficulty expressing, while Shimamura feels like Adachi is merely a friend to her. The series follows their relationship and the emerging romance which gradually develops as Adachi gathers the courage to open up further to Shimamura.

Characters

A first-year high school student who often skips classes. A beautiful girl with a slender figure and black hair, she works part-time at a Chinese restaurant. Adachi is a deeply introverted individual who generally eschews relationships with others, as she finds them to be a significant burden. This changes when she meets Shimamura, who is also skipping classes, on the second floor of the gymnasium. She has romantic feelings for Shimamura, and feels intense jealousy towards other girls who interact with her.
During a summer break in their second year of high school, Adachi confesses her feelings to Shimamura at a summer festival, and becomes her girlfriend.

A first-year high school student who tends to skip classes, though not as much as Adachi. Her hair is light brown colored, and she has an innocent personality. Although she thinks socializing is troublesome, she has a talent for taking care of others.
During a summer break in their second year of high school, Shimamura is confessed to by Adachi at a summer festival, and chooses to accept her feelings, thus becoming her girlfriend.

The youngest daughter of a wealthy family with four older brothers; a frivolous girl, short in stature and with black hair. She is not used to the refined atmosphere at home, often staying at Nagafuji's house. She became friends with Shimamura in high school.

A high school girl as tall as Shimamura with large breasts and glasses. Her recent worry is being stared at by boys. She is a little careless and always teased by Hino. She has been friends with Hino since kindergarten.

A self-proclaimed alien from the future who comes to Earth in search of her lost compatriot from space. She looks like an elementary school girl, but claims to be around 670 years old. She likes Shimamura and often plays with Shimamura's younger sister at home. She usually wanders around the town. Yashiro demonstrates telepathic abilities, and is described in a flash-forward sequence set ten years after the main events of the series as having never physically aged.
In the special novel stories included with the Japanese Blu-ray release of the series, Yashiro is depicted thousands of years after the events of the series, still not having aged. She encounters reincarnations of Adachi and Shimamura (called Chito and Shima) on a post-apocalyptic planet that has been colonized by a since-degraded future human civilization, and it is revealed that she has committed herself to ensuring that every version of Adachi and Shimamura continue to meet each other, having promised this to Shimamura in the past.

Shimamura's best friend in elementary school. She and Shimamura called each other "Shima-chan" and "Taru-chan", but became distant as a result of attending different junior high schools. The two happen to meet again in the winter of their first year of high school with the hope of restarting their friendship. She has a reputation as a delinquent because she often skipped school and wandered around in junior high. Tarumi's efforts to reignite her friendship with Shimamura upset Adachi, igniting extreme feelings of jealousy when she sees them together.

Media

Light novels
The original light novel series, written by Hitoma Iruma and illustrated by Non, was first serialized in ASCII Media Works' Dengeki Bunko Magazine in October 2012. ASCII Media Works began publishing the series under its Dengeki Bunko imprint on March 10, 2013. ASCII Media Works has published eleven volumes as of December 9, 2022, with the twelfth volume being the final volume. Seven Seas Entertainment have licensed the light novels for release in North America.

Manga
A manga adaptation illustrated by Mani was serialized online via Square Enix's Gangan Online website from April 4, 2016 to December 22, 2017. It was collected in three tankōbon volumes. A second manga adaptation with illustration by Moke Yuzuhara began serialization in ASCII Media Works' shōnen manga magazine Monthly Comic Dengeki Daioh on May 25, 2019. It has been collected in four tankōbon volumes. The second manga adaptation is licensed in North America by Yen Press.

2016 series

2019 series

Anime
An anime television series adaptation was announced on May 6, 2019. The series was animated by Tezuka Productions and directed by Satoshi Kuwabara, with Keiichirō Ōchi handling series composition, and Shizue Kaneko designing the characters. Natsumi Tabuchi, Hanae Nakamura, and Miki Sakurai composed the music. The opening theme is  performed by Akari Kitō and Miku Itō as their respective characters, while the ending theme is  performed by Kitō. It aired from October 9 to December 25, 2020 on TBS and BS11. The series ran for 12 episodes.

Funimation had acquired the series and streamed it on its website in North America and the British Isles, and on AnimeLab in Australia and New Zealand. On February 17, 2021, Funimation announced the series would be receiving an English dub, with the first episode premiering the next day. Following Sony's acquisition of Crunchyroll, the series was moved to Crunchyroll.

Reception
Joe Ballard of CBR reviewed the anime series throughout its run. In early reviews, Ballard said that it is similar to Bloom Into You and called it "a heartwarming coming-of-age story" while noting the "growing friendship" between Adachi and Shimamura, as their relationship expands, and their bond strengthens. In later reviews, he said that series focuses mainly on "two girls getting to know each other" as they learn more about each other along the way and their romance blossoms. In his review of the final episode, Ballard said that the story is "slowly blossoming into a love story" and added that end of the episode is symbolic, as Adachi and Shimamura are not sitting next to each other, "but they're a little closer than they were before." In January 2021, Constance Sarantos of CBR said that the series shares similar storyboarding moments which emphasize "intimate moments and loneliness" with the series Otherside Picnic. The same month, Ballad penned another review of the series, saying that the first season "concluded with more questions than answers," and hoped that a second season would bring "more concrete answers." The same month, Angelo Delos Trinos of CBR called the series a "heartwarming Shoujo Ai (i.e. Girls' Love) anime" which legitimizes the yuri genre, saying that it is unfortunate that not many people talk about it or "Yuri romances in general."

The School Library Journal listed the first volume of the Adachi and Shimamura (2019 manga) as one of the top 10 manga of 2021.

Notes

References

External links
 
 

2020 anime television series debuts
2012 Japanese novels
2013 Japanese novels
2020s Japanese LGBT-related television series 
Anime and manga based on light novels
ASCII Media Works manga
Crunchyroll anime
Dengeki Bunko
Dengeki Daioh
Extraterrestrials in anime and manga
Gangan Comics manga
Iyashikei anime and manga
Japanese LGBT-related animated television series
Japanese webcomics
Kadokawa Dwango franchises
Light novels
Seven Seas Entertainment titles
Shōnen manga
Tezuka Productions
Webcomics in print
Yen Press titles
Yuri (genre) anime and manga
Yuri (genre) light novels